Justynian Szczytt may refer to:
Justynian Szczytt (d. 1677), member of parliament of Polish–Lithuanian Commonwealth
Justynian Szczytt (1740–1824),  member of the parliament of the Polish–Lithuanian Commonwealth